This page details the process of the 2012 Africa Cup of Nations qualification phase. Forty-six African nations, including hosts Gabon and Equatorial Guinea, entered the competition. Gabon and Equatorial Guinea automatically qualified as host countries. The other 44 nations were drawn into eleven groups, each containing 4 teams. Togo was later added to Group K after its reinstatement.

In each group, teams played each other home and away in a round-robin format. The top team in each group qualified, as did the runner-up of Group K (which contained 5 teams) and the two best runners-up from the other groups.

Qualified teams

The teams qualified are:

1 Bold indicates champion for that year
2 Italic indicates host

Draw
CAF conducted the draw for the 2012 Africa Cup of Nations qualifying campaign on 20 February 2010. The draw was held at Lubumbashi, Congo DR where the CAF Super Cup was held on 21 February 2010. The 11 teams in Pot 1 were selected based on their ranking after the 27th edition of the Africa Cup of Nations in Angola. The rest were ranked based on their position at the latest FIFA Ranking.

Notes
Togo was initially banned from competing in the tournament and was thus not involved in the draw, but they were later reinstated and added to Group K (see below).

Togolese Ban
Togo were banned from the 2012 and 2013 Africa Cup of Nations tournaments by CAF after they withdrew from the 2010 tournament following a deadly attack on their team bus.

Togo appealed to the Court of Arbitration for Sport, with FIFA president Sepp Blatter stepping in to mediate. The ban was subsequently lifted with immediate effect on 14 May 2010, after a meeting of the CAF Executive Committee. Togo were readmitted to the 2012 and 2013 tournaments, and (in the case of the 2012 qualifiers) added to the qualification stage.

Tie-breaking rules 
The order of tie-breakers used when two or more team have the equal number of points is: (article 14)
 Number of points obtained in games between the teams concerned;
 Goal difference in games between the teams concerned;
 Goals scored in games between the teams concerned;
 Away goals scored in games between the teams concerned;
 Goal difference in all games;
 Goals scored in all games;
 Drawing of lots.

Qualifying group stage

Group A

Group B

Group C

Notes
 Note 1: Postponed from 4 September 2010, due to the late arrival of match officials.
 Note 2: Originally to be played at Tripoli, Libya but moved to neutral venue due to the political situation in Libya.

Group D

Note: The ranking of the Central African Republic and Algeria by their head-to-head records is shown below. As they could not be separated on these criteria, ranking was based on overall goal difference.

Group E

Group F

Mauritania withdrew from 2012 Africa Cup of Nations qualification before any match was played.

Notes
The Namibia Football Association made a formal complaint that Burkina Faso fielded an ineligible player, Yaoundé-born Herve Xavier Zengue, in the games on 26 March and 4 June. Burkina Faso coach Paulo Duarte says that the player is eligible as he has a Burkinabé wife. CAF opened an investigation, but later dismissed the protest saying it was filed long after the stipulated period for such appeals.
Namibia indicated that they would appeal the decision to CAF and, if necessary, to the Court of Arbitration for Sport on two different points. Firstly that an appeal had been filed with the match referee prior to their game with Burkina Faso but had not been forwarded to CAF and secondly that such an appeal was in any case not required due to article 36.12 of the competition regulations which stated that "non-qualified or a suspended player to take part in group matches shall lose the match by penalty (3–0), even in the absence of protests/reservations".
On 10 January 2012, their appeal was dismissed by the Court of Arbitration for Sport.

Group G

Notes
The South African Football Association lodged a complaint against their elimination, claiming that goal difference should be used to decide on the group winner, as it is "the traditional way of determining a log standing". The South African team had believed they had qualified when the final whistle was blown following their 0–0 draw with Sierra Leone. The SAFA later withdrew its appeal.

Group H

Note: The ranking of Burundi and Benin by their head-to-head records is shown below.  As they could not be separated on these criteria, ranking was based on overall goal difference.

Notes
 Note 3: Originally to be played at Abidjan, Ivory Coast but moved to neutral venue due to the political situation in Côte d'Ivoire.

Group I

Group J

Group K

Ranking of group runners-up
The two best runners-up from Groups A–J qualify for the 2012 ACN. After the withdrawal of Mauritania from Group F, the following rule applies:

The two best runners-up are determined by the following parameters in this order:
 Highest number of points
 Goal difference
 Highest number of goals scored
 Match replay in case of parity

Goalscorers
There were 327 goals scored in 130 games for an average of 2.52 goals per game.
6 goals

 Issam Jemâa

5 goals

 Jerome Ramatlhakwane
 Mamadou Niang

4 goals

 Manucho
 Alain Traoré
 Samuel Eto'o
 Didier Drogba
 Cheick Diabaté
 Papiss Cissé
 Moussa Sow
 Knowledge Musona

3 goals

 Stéphane Sessègnon
 Eric Maxim Choupo-Moting
 Yves Diba Ilunga
 Patou Kabangu
 Wilfried Bony
 Gervinho
 Marwan Mohsen
 Prince Tagoe
 Essau Kanyenda
 Chiukepo Msowoya
 Ikechukwu Uche
 Christopher Katongo
 Emmanuel Mayuka

2 goals

 Hassan Yebda
 Séïdath Tchomogo
 Didier Kavumbagu
 Faty Papy
 Moumouni Dagano
 Matthew Mbuta
 Héldon
 Charlie Dopékoulouyen
 Hilaire Momi
 Marius Mbaiam
 Ezechiel N'Douassel
 Francky Sembolo
 Salomon Kalou
 Didier Ya Konan
 Yaya Touré
 Fikru Teferra
 Oumed Oukri
 Saladin Said
 Momodou Ceesay
 Emmanuel Agyemang-Badu
 Asamoah Gyan
 Bobo Baldé
 Ismaël Bangoura
 Oumar Kalabane
 Patrick Wleh
 Robert Ng'ambi
 Jonathan Bru
 Mahamane Traoré
 Marouane Chamakh
 Tangeni Shipahu
 Moussa Maâzou
 Victor Obinna
 Peter Utaka
 Joseph Yobo
 Mohamed Bangura
 Katlego Mphela
 Mohamed Bashir
 Muhamed Tahir
 Shaban Nditi
 Mbwana Samata
 Backer Aloenouvo
 Mani Sapol
 Fahid Ben Khalfallah
 David Obua
 James Chamanga

1 goal

 Hameur Bouazza
 Adlène Guedioura
 Foued Kadir
 Flávio
 Gilberto
 Mateus Galiano
 Guy Akpagba
 Razak Omotoyossi
 Mickaël Poté
 Joel Mogorosi
 Phenyo Mongala
 Wilfried Balima
 Aristide Bancé
 Charles Kaboré
 Jonathan Pitroipa
 Abdou Razack Traoré
 Dugary Ndabashinze
 Selemani Ndikumana
 Saidi Ntibazonkiza
 Léonard Kweuke
 Landry N'Guémo
 Elvis Macedo Babanco
 Odaïr Fortes
 Ryan Mendes da Graça
 Valdo
 Fernando Varela
 Vianney Mabidé
 Karl Max Barthélémy
 Léger Djimrangar
 Mahamat Labbo
 Youssouf M'Changama
 Abdoulaide Mzé Mbaba
 Barel Mouko
 Lorry Nkolo
 Fabrice Ondama
 Dioko Kaluyituka
 Déo Kanda
 Lomana LuaLua
 Zola Matumona
 Emmanuel Eboué
 Romaric
 Kolo Touré
 Mahmoud Fathalla
 Mohamed Salah
 Shimelis Bekele
 Adane Girma
 Mamadou Danso
 Ousman Jallow
 Omar Jawo
 Sanna Nyassi
 Dominic Adiyiah
 André Ayew
 John Mensah
 Sulley Muntari
 Hans Sarpei
 Isaac Vorsah
 Mamadou Bah
 Karamoko Cissé
 Kévin Constant
 Sadio Diallo
 Ibrahima Traoré
 Ibrahim Yattara
 Kamil Zayatte
 Basile de Carvalho
 Dionísio
 Mike Baraza
 McDonald Mariga
 Jamal Mohamed
 Dennis Oliech
 Francis Doe
 Alsény Këïta
 Sekou Oliseh
 Theo Lewis Weeks
 Dioh Williams
 Ahmed Abdelkader
 Rabee Allafi
 Djamal Bindi
 Ihaab Boussefi
 Walid Mhadeb El Khatroushi
 Ahmed Saad Osman
 Faed Arsène
 Yvan Rajoarimanana
 Baggio Rakotonomenjanahary
 Jean José Razafimandimby
 Davi Banda
 Moses Chavula
 Hellings Mwakasungula
 Harry Nyirenda
 Jimmy Zakazaka
 Cédric Kanté
 Abdou Traoré
 Oussama Assaidi
 Medhi Benatia
 Mbark Boussoufa
 Mounir El Hamdaoui
 Youssouf Hadji
 Adel Taarabt
 Dário
 Domingues
 Josemar
 Maninho
 Wilko Risser
 Kamilou Daouda
 Alhassane Issoufou
 Dankwa Koffi
 Issa Modibo Sidibé
 Michael Eneramo
 Obafemi Martins
 Kalu Uche
 Labama Bokota
 Eric Gasana
 Jean-Claude Iranzi
 Mere Kagere
 Elias Uzamukunda
 Demba Ba
 Dame N'Doye
 Mustapha Bangura
 Teteh Bangura
 Sheriff Suma
 Andile Jali
 Bernard Parker
 Bakri Al-Madina
 Mudather El Tahir
 Galag
 Ala'a Eldin Yousif
 Darren Christie
 Manqoba Kunene
 Abdi Kassim
 Jerson Tegete
 Kondo Arimiyaou
 Serge Gakpé
 Aymen Abdennour
 Amine Chermiti
 Oussama Darragi
 Walid Hichri
 Saber Khalifa
 Khaled Korbi
 Geofrey Massa
 Andrew Mwesigwa
 Geoffrey Sserunkuma
 Godfrey Walusimbi
 Rainford Kalaba
 Collins Mbesuma
 Fwayo Tembo
 Khama Billiat
 Ovidy Karuru
 Willard Katsande

1 own goal

 Eric Nkulukuta (playing against Cameroon)
 Ben Teekloh (playing against Mali)
 Joye Estazie (playing against Senegal)
 Richard Gariseb (playing against Burkina Faso)

References

External links

Africa Cup of Nations at CAFonline.com

2012
Qualification
Qual
Qual